Roger LaLonde (born January 6, 1942) is a former football player who played for the Detroit Lions, New York Giants, Montreal Alouettes and Hamilton Tiger-Cats. He won the Grey Cup with Hamilton in 1967. He previously played college football at Muskingum University in New Concord, Ohio. LaLonde was selected in the 1964 NFL draft by the Lions (Round 15, #201 overall). He was also picked in the 1964 AFL draft by the Boston Patriots (Round 8, #61 overall).

References

1942 births
Living people
American football defensive tackles
Canadian football defensive linemen
American players of Canadian football
Muskingum Fighting Muskies football players
Detroit Lions players
New York Giants players
Montreal Alouettes players
Hamilton Tiger-Cats players
People from Antwerp, New York
Players of American football from New York (state)